The judiciary of Malta interprets and applies the laws of Malta, to ensure equal justice under law, and to provide a mechanism for dispute resolution. The legal system of Malta is based partially on English law and partly on Continental law, whilst also being subject to European Union law.

In its pre-accession evaluation reports in 2003, the European Commission suggested that there should be reform in the judicial appointment procedure, "controlled by political bodies" (i.e. the Parliament and parties therein), to improve objectivity. The Commission also pointed to the need to check the procedure for challenging judges and magistrates provided for by Article 738 of the Code of Organisation and Civil Procedure with the principle of an impartial tribunal enshrined in the European Convention on Human Rights.

The December 2018 Venice Commission Opinion on constitutional arrangements and separation of powers and the independence of the judiciary and law enforcement in Malta has pointed the finger to several issues requiring reforms to ensure the independence of the judiciary in Malta which has led to a number of reforms on the appointments and removal of the Judiciary of Malta.

System of Courts 
The judiciary is defined by the Constitution of Malta as a hierarchical system of courts, with a Constitutional Court, separate Civil and Criminal Courts of original jurisdiction. In the criminal court, typically the presiding judge sits with a jury of nine. The Court of Appeal and the Court of Criminal Appeal hear appeals from decisions of the civil and criminal cases delivered by the superior and inferior courts respectively. Inferior courts are presided over by magistrates with original jurisdiction in criminal and civil actions.

The highest court, the Constitutional Court, has both original and appellate jurisdiction. In its appellate jurisdiction it adjudicates cases involving violations of human rights and interpretation of the Constitution. It can also perform judicial review. In its original jurisdiction it has jurisdiction over disputed parliamentary elections and electoral corruption practices.
the Constitutional Court's judgments do not have explicit erga omnes effect, and norms which have been found unconstitutional need to be repealed by Parliament. The Court is thus faced with repetitive cases due to its jurisprudence not being taken into account by the administration or even by other judges. The Venice Commission notes that “the Constitution should be amended to provide that judgments of the Constitutional Court finding a legal provision unconstitutional will result directly in the annulment of that provision without intervention by Parliament” (#78)

The organisation of the judiciary in Malta foresees a wide range of specialised tribunals: 

 Police Licenses Appeals Tribunal
 Prison Appeals Tribunal
 Building and Construction Tribunal
 International Protection Appeals Tribunal
 Industrial Tribunal
 Arbiter & Patents Tribunal
 Administrative Review Tribunal
 Information and Data Protection Appeals Tribunal
 Partition of Inheritances Tribunal
 Small Claims Tribunal
 Environment and Planning Review Tribunal
 Commercial Sanctions Tribunal
 Financial Services Tribunal
 Consumer Claims Tribunal

These often do not enjoy the same level of judicial independence as the ordinary judiciary, which risks being undermined by their expansion, with the danger of parallel jurisdictions.

Appointment

The appointment the Chief Justice is made by the President of Malta following a two-thirds resolution by the House of Representatives of Malta.  

Judges have security of tenure until the mandatory retiring age of 65 (or 68 if they wish to extend), or until impeachment. The Constitution also foresees that the adjudicators' salaries are paid from the Consolidated Fund and thus the government may not diminish or amend them to their prejudice.

A Judicial Appointments Committee (a subcommittee of the Commission for the Administration of Justice) composed of 5 non-judicial members which recommend appointments of judges of the superior court and magistrates of the inferior court directly to the President of Malta.

Discipline 

The Constitution of Malta provides for a Committee for Judges and Magistrates which shall consist of three members of the judiciary who are not members of the Commission for the Administration of Justice. This sub-committee shall have the power to exercise disciplinary measures on a member of the judiciary who is in breach of the code of ethics for the Members of the Judiciary.

The constitution deals with judicial discipline by establishing a Committee for Judges and Magistrates able to commence proceedings for breach of the provisions of the Code of Ethics (Art. 101B, introduced in 2016). Although only broadly defined, these norms are accompanied by more concrete guidelines. Sanctions (warning, fines, suspensions) are meted out by a 3-member Committee for Judges and Magistrates. Yet, such committee cannot dismiss a judge or magistrate; dismissal is in the hands of the Commission for the Administration of Justice. Impeachment may be based on the grounds of proved inability to perform judiciary functions in office (whether it is infirmity of body or mind or any other cause) or proved misbehavior.

Prosecution 

Prosecution tasks in Malta are shared between the Malta Police Force, who investigate crimes and presses charges, and the Attorney General (AG), who prosecutes the cases. Magistrates may also start ‘inquests’, originally foreseen to preserve evidence, but today rather fully-fledged investigations.

Members of the Judiciary of Malta 
In 2019 Malta had 22 magistrates and 24 judges, as well as a Chief Justice. The judges are styled as "The Honourable Mister/Madam Justice".

Bench of Judges 
 Mark Chetcuti (Chief Justice)
 Giannino Caruana Demajo (Senior Administrative Judge and Vice-Chairman, Judicial Studies Committee)
 Joseph R. Micallef
 Tonio Mallia
 Abigail Lofaro ** (President of the Family Section of the Civil Court)   
 Anna Felice ** (President of the General Jurisdiction Section of the Civil Court)
 Joseph Zammit McKeon (President of the Commercial Section of the Civil Court)
 Silvio Meli
 Anthony Ellul
 Jacqueline Padovani Grima
 Robert Mangion
 Lorraine Schembri Orland (Judge elect in respect of Malta to the European Court of Human Rights)
 Edwina Grima
 Lawrence Mintoff
 Miriam Hayman
 Giovanni Grixti
 Toni Abela
 Consuelo Scerri Herrera
 Anthony Vella
 Grazio Mercieca
 Francesco Depasquale
 Aaron Bugeja
 Joanne Vella Cuschieri

(** on the list of ad hoc judges on the European Court of Human Rights in respect of Malta—Rule 29 of the Rules of Court of the European Court of Human Rights)

Bench of Magistrates 

 Paul Coppini
 Audrey Demicoli (Senior Magistrate)
 Doreen Clarke
 Gabriella Vella
 Claire Stafrace Zammit
 Marse-Ann Farrugia
 Josette Demicoli
 Neville Camilleri
 Ian Farrugia
 Natasha Galea Sciberras
 Charmaine Galea
 Joseph Mifsud
 Monica Vella
 Donatella Frendo Dimech
 Caroline Farrugia Frendo
 Yana Micallef Stafrace 
 Rachel Montebello
 Simone Grech
 Astrid May Grima 
 Nadine Lia
 Victor Asciak
 Bridgitte Sultana
 Elaine Mercieca
 Lara Lanfranco
 Noel Bartolo
 Leonard Caruana

References

Further reading
Victor Paul Borg, Judicial appointments: ‘Worst constitutional mess since Independence’ Times of Malta, 28 April 2019. Retrieved 23 August 2022. Archived from the original on 28 March 2021.
Ivan Camilleri, Swearing-in ceremony of judiciary goes ahead in spite of court challenge Times of Malta, 25 April 2019. Retrieved 23 August 2022. Archived from the original on 30 November 2019.
"Opinion No. 940 / 2018 (CDL-AD(2018)028) on constitutional arrangements and separation of powers and the independence of the judiciary and law enforcement in Malta". venice.coe.int. European Commission for Democracy Through Law (Venice Commission), Council of Europe. 17 December 2018. Archived from the original on 3 June 2022.

External links

 
Government of Malta
Law of Malta